The 1949 All England Championships was a badminton tournament held at the Harringay Arena, London, England, from 2–5 March 1949.

Final results

Men's singles

Section 1

Section 2

+Denotes Seed

Women's singles

Section 1

Section 2

References

All England Open Badminton Championships
All England Badminton Championships
All England Open Badminton Championships in London
All England Championships
All England Badminton Championships
All England Badminton Championships